Owen Tangavelou (born 4 March 2005) is a French racing driver of Vietnamese and Polish descent who is set to compete in the Formula Regional European Championship with Trident, having previously raced with Race Performance Motorsport.

Career

Karting 
Tangavelou started his career at the relatively late age of fourteen in France. He raced in several regional competitions before stepping up to Formula 4.

Formula 4

2020 
In 2020 Tangavelou made his car racing debut in the French F4 Championship. Due to a lack of testing prior to the season, as well as him stating that he had "not enough experience" in racing at the time, the Frenchman finished 12th in the championship with a best race result of fifth place at Le Castellet.

2021 
Tangavelou remained in French F4 for 2021. The French driver started his season out strongly with his first podium in single-seaters at the opening race in Nogaro. He scored a further podium later in the season in the reversed-grid race at the Circuit Paul Ricard and finished fifth in the standings, having also set two fastest laps. In the FIA standings of the championship Tangavelou also finished fifth, with a total of nine podiums, including three third places at the Hungaroring.

Formula Regional

2022 
Moving into 2022, Tangavelou made his debut in the Formula Regional category by racing in the final three rounds of the Formula Regional Asian Championship with Hitech Grand Prix. He had a best finish of 13th in the final race, one in which he scored a rookie podium, and ended up 31st in the standings.

The Frenchman's main series that year would be the Formula Regional European Championship, which he would contest with G4 Racing. Following the first half of the season, which yielded a best finish of 14th at Le Castellet, Tangavelou switched to the RPM team to partner Pietro Delli Guanti. His results would improve almost instantly, with him getting his first points at the Hungaroring and scoring two further ninth places at the next round in Spa-Francorchamps. Another point came at the Red Bull Ring, before Tangavelou scored a season-best finish of sixth place at the season finale in Mugello, thereby taking the rookie victory within that race, which elevated him to 20th in the standings.

2023 
In 2023, Tangavelou moved to Trident for his second season in the series.

Racing record

Racing career summary 

* Season still in progress.

Complete French F4 Championship results 
(key) (Races in bold indicate pole position) (Races in italics indicate fastest lap)

Complete Formula Regional European Championship results 
(key) (Races in bold indicate pole position) (Races in italics indicate fastest lap)

* Season still in progress.

Complete Formula Regional Middle East Championship results
(key) (Races in bold indicate pole position) (Races in italics indicate fastest lap)

 – Driver did not finish the race but was classified, as he completed more than 90% of the race distance.
* Season still in progress.

References

External links 
 
  (in French)

2005 births
Living people
French racing drivers
French F4 Championship drivers
Formula Regional European Championship drivers
Formula Regional Asian Championship drivers
Hitech Grand Prix drivers
French people of Vietnamese descent
French people of Polish descent
Trident Racing drivers
Formula Regional Middle East Championship drivers
MP Motorsport drivers